Årdal Church is a parish church of the Church of Norway in Hjelmeland Municipality in Rogaland county, Norway. It is located in the village of Årdal. It is the church for the Årdal parish which is part of the Ryfylke prosti (deanery) in the Diocese of Stavanger. The white, wooden church was built in a cruciform design in 1914-1916 using designs by the architect Einar Halleland. The church seats about 250 people.

It was consecrated in 1919. Since it is the "new" church, it is also known as the New Årdal Church.

See also
List of churches in Rogaland

References

Hjelmeland
Churches in Rogaland
Wooden churches in Norway
20th-century Church of Norway church buildings
Churches completed in 1916
1914 establishments in Norway